Travolta Paparino Waterhouse (born 19 September 1978) is a Samoan former judoka. He competed in the men's lightweight event at the 2000 Summer Olympics. Waterhouse first faced the eventual gold medalist Giuseppe Maddaloni of Italy in the first round of competition but lost the bout. In the repechage round, Waterhouse was paired with Hassen Moussa of Tunisia but once again lost the bout and didn't proceed through to the final stages. Waterhouse's overall final placing was joint-thirteenth.

References

External links
 

1978 births
Living people
Samoan male judoka
Olympic judoka of Samoa
Judoka at the 2000 Summer Olympics
Place of birth missing (living people)